(Rachel) Louise McManus (1896 – May 29, 1993) was the first nurse to earn a Ph.D. She established schools of nursing in college and helped to develop nationally standardized methods for nursing licensure in the United States.

Education
Louise McManus earned her nursing degree at the Massachusetts General Hospital School of Nursing in 1921. She completed bachelor's (1925), master's (1927) and doctoral (1946) degrees at Columbia University's Teachers College, where she earned a PhD in educational research, becoming the first nurse to acquire a PhD.

Achievements
McManus created the Institute for Nursing Research at Teachers College, Columbia University, where she later served as faculty member and dean. McManus saw herself as an advocate for patients and developed a "Patient Bill of Rights" that was adopted by the Joint Commission in Accreditation of Hospitals. She also served on the Defense Advisory Committee on Women in the Armed Services.

Awards and honors
 Columbia University Bicentennial Award 
 Florence Nightingale International Red Cross Society Citation and Medal 
 Mary Adelaide Nutting Award for Leadership
 1994: Inductee, National Women's Hall of Fame

In recognition of her contributions to the field of nursing, the National Council of State Boards of Nursing established the R. Louise McManus Award and the Meritorious Service Award. The R. Louise Mcmanus Medal was established to recognize distinguished long-standing contributions to the field of nursing.

The Library at the Center for Nursing at the Foundation of New York State Nurses was dedicated in her honor with an endowment by the Nursing Education Alumni Association of Teachers College (TCNEAA).

Personal life 
She was born Rachel Louise Metcalfe in 1896. She was a native of North Smithfield, R. I. In 1929, she married a widower named John Hugh McManus who had four daughters and two sons. Together they had a daughter, Joan, bringing the total number of children to seven. One of her stepsons was George Boles McManus, who became a senior administrator at the Central Intelligence Agency. Her husband died suddenly in 1934.

Death
Louise McManus died on May 29, 1993 in a Natick, Massachusetts nursing home. She was 97 years old. She was survived by four daughters, 37 grandchildren, and one great-great-grandchild.

References

1896 births
1993 deaths
American nurses
American women nurses
Columbia University faculty
Teachers College, Columbia University faculty
Teachers College, Columbia University alumni
20th-century American women
20th-century American people
American women academics